The Baldwin Wallace Yellow Jackets are the athletic teams for Baldwin Wallace University. The Yellow Jackets participate in Division III of the NCAA in the Ohio Athletic Conference. BW's rivalries include John Carroll University and University of Mount Union. BW's most successful athletic programs include cross country and swimming and diving. Among BW's most famous alumni related to athletics include Harrison Dillard, Lee Tressel, and Jim Tressel.

History
The university has long rivalries with John Carroll University and University of Mount Union. Perhaps the most notable BW athlete from the 20th century was Harrison Dillard, the only male so far to win Olympic titles in both sprinting and hurdling events, in the 1948 Summer Olympics. The teams of the Sidney High School Yellow Jackets were named after Baldwin Wallace graduate Granville Robinson became Head Coach at Sidney High School. The teams' colors are officially brown and gold. During the 1990s and early 2000s, the school used burgundy and teal as well as maroon and gold for its marketing literature. Since the mid-2000s, BW returned to its roots with using brown and gold. In 2009 after almost 20 years of use, BW adopted a new logo and modified the university's mascot for the athletic teams.

Mascot

The official mascot of Baldwin Wallace University is Stinger. Stinger is depicted as a Yellow Jacket, specifically after the Eastern yellowjacket found throughout North America. Stinger is seen at many athletic events and university functions. In 2009 after almost 20 years of use BW adopted a new logo and modified the mascot for the university's athletic teams.

Varsity sports
The Baldwin Wallace Yellow Jackets varsity sports participate in Division III of the NCAA in the Ohio Athletic Conference. BW has 13 men's varsity teams and 11 women's varsity teams. Relatively recent additions to BW's sports offerings include men's and women's lacrosse, which were added for the 2012–13 season. The school's newest varsity sport is men's volleyball, which begins play in the 2021 season (2020–21 school year). Since the OAC sponsors volleyball only for women, the new team competes in the single-sport Midwest Collegiate Volleyball League.

Football

BW holds the title for Most Wins in the OAC.  In the 106-year history of football at the university, the Yellow Jackets have compiled an all-time record of 546–319–30. The 546 wins are the most of any current OAC member school. Baldwin Wallace's football team was coached by Lee Tressel, who led the team to an undefeated record in 1978, and subsequently the NCAA Division III Championship.

Basketball
The men's Basketball team hold the record of Five OAC Regular Season Championships, Five OAC Tournament Titles, Seven trips to the NCAA Tournament and Seven All-Americans.

The women's Basketball team hold the records of 11 berths to the NCAA Division III National Tournament, Four "Elite Eight" finishes (1999–2000, 2000–2001 and 2005–2006, 2011–2012), Seven OAC regular season titles and Five OAC Tournament crowns.

Cross country
The Women's Cross Country record has 16 OAC cross country titles for the years of 1986, 1987, 1988, 1989, 1992, 1993, 1994, 1995, 1996, 1997, 1999, 2000, 2001, 2007 and 2009.  The Men's Cross Country record has 5 OAC cross country titles for the years of 1973, 1979, 1981, 1982 and 1983.

Track and field
 
BW's Women's team won the 2016 Indoor Track and Field National Championship and were Runner's Up at the Outdoor National Championship.  BW also holds the record for 2008 OAC Indoor Champions. The women's indoor and outdoor track & field teams have won 17 Ohio Athletic Conference indoor titles, including 15 straight from 1988 through 2002, and 16 OAC outdoor crowns, including a pair of OAC-record streaks of seven straight years. Add that success to 16 OAC cross country titles.

Wrestling
BW Wrestling has the record of Two NCAA National Champions, Two NCAA Runners-Up, 10 Division III All-Americans and 18 OAC champions.

Club sports
BW club sports include Running Club, Men's Club Volleyball, Racquetball, Paintball and Archery. In 2012 BW moved its club Lacrosse to an official sport, and men's volleyball became a varsity sport in the 2020–21 school year.

Racquetball
Baldwin Wallace has a great tradition of racquetball, including two USAR men's team intercollegiate titles in 2001 & 2002 and an overall Division II team title in 2006.  Shane Vanderson won the USAR Intercollegiate racquetball men's championship in 2001, and three Baldwin Wallace players have won the women's title. Sheryl Lotts won it in 2009, Kristen Walsh in 2001 and Krystal Csuk won in 2002. Baldwin-Wallace players won the doubles title four times. Vanderson and Andy Hawthorne won the men's doubles title in 2002 and 2003, and Elle Summers won the women's title with Walsh in 2001 and with Csuk in 2002.

Of those champions, Vanderson and Hawthorne have gone on to be top 10 players on the International Racquetball Tour while Walsh and Csuk have been top 10 players on the Women's Professional Racquetball Organization tour. All four of these players have also represented the USA internationally.

Facilities

Baldwin Wallace University participates in NCAA Division III athletics. Facilities include The Lou Higgins Center, The George Finnie Stadium, Heritage Field and the "Pop" Collins Tennis Complex.

Fight song
BW Fight Song
Fight, Baldwin Wallace 
Fight, Baldwin Wallace 
Fight and win this game;

We're cheering for you, 
There's glory for you, 
We're on the road to fame;

And in the battle, 
We'll prove our mettle, 
We're loyal, square, and brave.

Vict'ry will crown our might, 
And in the breeze tonight 
Our Brown and Gold shall wave!

Awww... JACKETS!

Written by Katherin Olderman in 1928

People

Notable athletes

Baldwin Wallace University has over 41,000 alumni living throughout the United States. BW has many alumni that still reside throughout Ohio. Some notable Alumni in sports include former OSU Football coach Jim Tressel and his father Lee Tressel, former NFL player and first Atlanta Falcons head coach Norb Hecker, CBS announcer Bud Collins, and Olympian Harrison Dillard.  Lance Yandell who was a star Wide receiver setting records for Baldwin Wallace football. BW has had many alumni become representatives for the state of Ohio. As well, BW has a large network of alumni who have gone into Broadway due to its strong performing arts program.

Gallery

References

External links